The Sam Houston Regional Library and Research Center is located in unincorporated Liberty County, Texas. It is owned and operated by the Texas State Library and Archives Commission and contains publications, manuscripts and photographs. The library and archives are located in the 1850s Jean and Price Daniel House, which was patterned after the Greek Revival style Texas Governor's Mansion.

The Center features two historic houses and one historic church that have been relocated to the grounds. The 1848 Gillard-Duncan House has been restored and furnished with original furnishings of Dr. Edward J. Gillard and his wife Emma DeBlanc Gillard, and is available for tours during the week.  The 1893 Norman House'  has been restored to reflect the Victorian era, and features a parlor with housekeeping and food processing artifacts, a room with an exhibit on Victorian women's fashions and grooming aids, and a room with exhibits about the Norman family.  The 1898 St. Stephen's Episcopal Church is used for meetings. Archives and displays show development of region, artifacts, furniture, Jean Lafitte's journals, and 1826 census. It also contains the Texana collection of former Governor Price Daniel. The Center features a large collection of photographs and illustrations of Sam Houston and the papers of Governor Price Daniel. Changing exhibits from the Center's collections focus on South Texas history.

History
Governor and Mrs. Price Daniel donated  of land for the purpose of establishing a library on September 27, 1973. Construction began in the fall of 1975; by then $700,000 had been raised through private donations. The library opened on May 14, 1977. The library commission selected the Liberty area as the site of its archive because Liberty is the site of Atascocito, a former Spanish outpost that became the seat of government of a ten-county area that formed in 1826; the settlement's name changed to Liberty in 1831. The counties were all or partially within the Atascosito-Liberty District.

References

External links

Sam Houston Regional Library and Research Center - official site

Library buildings completed in 1977
1977 establishments in Texas
Historic house museums in Texas
Museums in Liberty County, Texas
Libraries established in 1977
Sam Houston
Libraries in Liberty County, Texas
Research libraries in the United States